"Feels Like Another One" is a song by American singer Patti LaBelle. It was written by LaBelle along with Sharon Barnes, James R. "Budd" Ellison, and Michael Stokes for her  eleventh studio album Burnin (1991), while production was helmed by Stokes. The new jack swing-styled track served as the album's leading single and featured a rap from rapper Big Daddy Kane. The song became successful on the US Hot R&B/Hip-Hop Songs as it ended up peaking at number three. The video for the song was shot at the Apollo Theater and also featured Kane, who appeared at LaBelle's show wearing a tux.

Credits and personnel 
Credits adapted from the liner notes of Burnin'.

Sharon Barnes – executive producer, vocals, writer
James R. "Budd" Ellison – associate producer, writer
Patti LaBelle – writer
Michael Stokes – arranger, producer, writer

Charts

References

1991 singles
Patti LaBelle songs
MCA Records singles
New jack swing songs
Dance-pop songs
1991 songs
Songs written by Patti LaBelle
Songs written by Michael Stokes (record producer)
Song recordings produced by Michael Stokes (record producer)